Birdy Sweeney (14 June 1931 – 11 May 1999) was an Irish actor and comedian.

Born Edmund Francis Sweeney in Dungannon, County Tyrone, he garnered his nickname "Birdy" from his childhood ability to imitate bird calls which he demonstrated on BBC Radio Ulster. He was a stand-up comedian on the club circuit for more than thirty years before he gained his first acting work as an extra in BBC Northern Ireland's adaptation of the play Too Late to Talk to Billy in 1982.

Sweeney made minor appearances in several major films, including The Crying Game (1992), The Hanging Gale (1995), The Snapper (1993) The Butcher Boy (1997), and Angela's Ashes, and made his stage debut in the 1989 Dublin production of The Iceman Cometh at the Abbey Theatre. From 1996, he played farmer Eamon Byrne in the first four series of the BBC drama series Ballykissangel.

Death
Sweeney died on 11 May 1999 at St. Vincent's University Hospital, Dublin, aged 67, He was survived by his wife Alice and their eight children.

Filmography

References

External links

1931 births
1999 deaths
Male film actors from Northern Ireland
Male stage actors from Northern Ireland
Male television actors from Northern Ireland
People from Dungannon
Stand-up comedians from Northern Ireland
20th-century male actors from Northern Ireland
20th-century British comedians